Albert Victor Newell (June 12, 1897 – May 5, 1967) was a Canadian professional ice hockey player. He played with the Saskatoon Crescents, Edmonton Eskimos, and Regina Capitals of the Western Canada Hockey League. He also played for the Vancouver Maroons of the Pacific Coast Hockey Association. He died in California in 1967.

References

External links

1897 births
1967 deaths
Canadian ice hockey defencemen
Edmonton Eskimos (ice hockey) players
Regina Capitals players
Saskatoon Sheiks players
Ice hockey people from Winnipeg
Vancouver Maroons players